In the Margins may refer to:

"In the Margins" (song), a 2005 song by Echo & the Bunnymen
In the Margins: On the Pleasures of Reading and Writing, a 2021 book of essays by Elena Ferrante
In the Margins Award, an American literary award